Lorenzo Pinamonte (born 9 May 1978) is a retired Italian footballer who last played as a midfielder and forward for Brindisi.

He also spent a number of seasons in England playing for Bristol City, Carlisle United, Brighton & Hove Albion, Brentford and Leyton Orient.

Career in England
Pinamonte made his debut for Bristol City in a First Division match; a 1–0 home win against Norwich City at Ashton Gate on 9 May 1999 in which he scored the only goal of the game. He had two loan spells whilst at Bristol City; the first to Carlisle United in March 1999, but he didn't make any appearances. The second to Brighton & Hove Albion in late 1999. At Brighton he made 9 league appearances and scored 2 goals; both coming in a 4–2 win over Exeter City in January 2000. Shortly afterwards he signed for Brentford where he remained until July 2001. Whilst at Brentford he had a loan spell at Leyton Orient where he scored on his debut against Halifax Town.

Later career
He returned to Italy in 2001 joining Castel di Sangro in the Serie C1, then playing at Serie C1 and Serie C2 with Arezzo, Novara, Benevento and Lumezzane. In November 2008 he left Lumezzane to join Serie D team Brindisi.

References

External links 

Living people
1978 births
Italian footballers
Bristol City F.C. players
Carlisle United F.C. players
Brighton & Hove Albion F.C. players
Brentford F.C. players
Leyton Orient F.C. players
S.S. Arezzo players
Novara F.C. players
Benevento Calcio players
F.C. Lumezzane V.G.Z. A.S.D. players
S.S.D. Città di Brindisi players
English Football League players
Association football midfielders
Association football forwards